The Saint-Avold Synagogue is a Jewish synagogue at the corner of Rue des Americains and Rue de la Mertzelle near Place Paul-Collin in Saint-Avold, France. The current synagogue building, completed in 1956, replaces a nearby synagogue destroyed during the German occupation of France in World War II.

History 

The presence of a synagogue in this part of Moselle dates back to the 1660s, when an ordinance by the local episcopate mentioned the existence of a synagogue in the area.

One old synagogue was conducting services as early as 1817, when the local businessman who they rented a building from sold the house.

A burned building situated on Rue des Anges was then acquired by David Elli, Salomon Nathan and Salomon Friburg,  members of the Jewish community of Saint-Avold, and restored by them. One of the floors in the building was then used by the community to serve as a synagogue in June 1824.

A new synagogue was constructed in the place of this building in 1825 on orders by the Prefecture. Despite the risk of financial ruin, the synagogue was reconstructed between 1858–1860 with the help of a grant by Mayor Charles Joseph Spinga. The architect of the building's facade was Jeannin. In 1871, the Rabbinic authority of Saint-Avold was reorganized by Imperial German authorities and divided into two separate Rabbinates: one in Boulay and one in Saint-Avold. After World War I and the return of Alsace-Moselle to France, the community lost several German members. The synagogue was renovated between 1922–1923. The newly renovated synagogue hosted the inauguration of Nathan Netter, the Chief Rabbi of Metz, on April 19, 1923. Ransacked and desecrated by the Nazis in 1940, it was turned into a firehouse, and later destroyed.

In 1956 the current synagogue was built a few meters from the previous location. Designed by architect Roger Zonca and Studio Constructa, it is located at the corner of Rue des Americains and Rue de la Mertzelle near Place Paul-Collin. During the European Days of Jewish Culture, the synagogue served as a concert space. The new synagogue was vandalized and set on fire on August 31, 1992, but was carefully restored.

Photo gallery

Bibliography 

 J.-C. Eckert et R. Maurer, Saint-Avold, cité d’Art ? Visages méconnus de la Lorraine, tome 1 et 2, imprimerie Léon Louis, Boulay, 1977 (édition numérotée).
 Lucien Henrion, Pascal Flaus, Si les rues de Saint Nabor m'étaient contées, imprimerie Léon Louis, Boulay-Moselle, juin 2001.
 Bulletins de la Société d’histoire du Pays naborien (Saint-Avold et environs): Les cahiers naboriens n°6, n°8 et n°18.
 « Saint-Avold : voir, toucher et goûter aux symboles des fêtes juives », dans Le Républicain lorrain, 17 octobre 2013.
 « Compte de Jean Croonders rendu à la princesse de Phalsbourg et Lixheim, Henriette de Lorraine, dame de Hombourg et Saint-Avold. Recette en deniers de la veuve d’un Juif, Isaac de Saint-Avold, pour la permission de faire le trafic et change des espèces », archives départementales de Meurthe-et-Moselle, B 6510 non folioté, 1631.
 « Les juifs lorrains au XVIIIe siècle », dans le Bulletin de la Société philomatique vosgienne, 1898.
 « La lignée d’Abraham de Saint-Avold », dans la Revue du Cercle de généalogie juive, n° 66.
 Jacques Bloch (sous l’égide du consistoire israélite de la Moselle), Le Martyrologue des Juifs de la Moselle.
 Dominique Jarassé, L'âge d'or des synagogues, Herscher éditeur, 1991.
 Paul Lévy, Tribune Juive (Les écoles juives d'Alsace et de Lorraine vers 1833), n°32 - 37, Strasbourg.
 Témoignage d'un lycéen au Puy de 1939 à 1945, publié le 30 janvier 2009. Publication de l'association fraternelle des anciens et anciennes élèves du lycée Charles et Adrien Dupuy (Le Puy-en-Velay).

See also 
 Saint-Avold
 Histoire des Juifs en Lorraine
 Lorraine
 Liste de synagogues de France
 Liste des musées juifs en France
 Juifs et judaïsme en Europe
 Histoire des Juifs en Lorraine
 Liste des toponymes juifs en France

References

External links 

 Structurae.de
 Société d'Histoire du Pays Naborien

17th-century synagogues
Synagogues in France